Aimee Nezhukumatathil (Malayalam Abugida: നേഴുകുമറ്റത്തിൽ; ;  born in 1974 in Chicago, Illinois) is an American poet and essayist. Nezhukumatathil draws upon her Filipina and Malayali Indian background to give her perspective on love, loss, and land.

Biography
Nezhukumatathil received her BA and MFA from the Ohio State University. In 2016–17 she was the John and Renee Grisham Writer-in-Residence at the University of Mississippi's MFA program. She has also taught at the Kundiman Retreat for Asian American writers. She is professor of English in the University of Mississippi's MFA program. She is married to the writer Dustin Parsons. They live in Oxford, Mississippi, with their two sons.

Work
She is author of four poetry collections. Her first collection, Miracle Fruit, won the 2003 Tupelo Press Prize and the Global Filipino Literary Award in Poetry, was named the ForeWord Magazine Book of the Year in Poetry, and was a finalist for the Asian American Literary Award and the Glasgow Prize. Her second, At the Drive-In Volcano, won the 2007 Balcones Poetry Prize. With Ross Gay, in 2014 she co-authored the epistolary nature chapbook, Lace & Pyrite. Oceanic was published in 2018 and won the 2019 Mississippi Institute of Arts and Letters award for poetry. She is also the author of the New York Times bestselling book of essays World of Wonders: In Praise of Fireflies, Whale Sharks, and Other Astonishments, which was published in 2020 by Milkweed Editions and was a Barnes & Noble Book of the Year, as well as an NPR 2020 Best Book of the Year.

Of her process, Nezhukumatathil has stated: "I never set out to write a book—even after 4 books, I still find that prospect daunting. Instead, I focus on the individual poems, getting those done week after week. And sometimes some quiet times in between too."

Among Nezhukumatathil's awards are a 2020 Guggenheim Fellowship in poetry, a Mississippi Arts Commission Fellowship grant, inclusion in the Best American Poetry series, a 2009 National Endowment for the Arts Literature Fellowship in poetry, and a Pushcart Prize for the poem "Love in the Orangery". Her poems and essays have appeared in New Voices: Contemporary Poetry from the United States, The American Poetry Review, FIELD, Prairie Schooner, Poetry, New England Review, and Tin House. Nezhukumatathil serves as poetry editor for Orion magazine.

Books
Fishbone, Snail's Pace Press, 2000 (chapbook)
One Bite, Ohio State University, 2000 (MFA thesis) 
Miracle Fruit: poems, Tupelo Press, 2003, 
At the Drive-in Volcano: Poems, Tupelo Press, 2007,  
Lucky Fish,  Tupelo Press, 2011,  
Lace & Pyrite, (with Ross Gay) Ow Arts Press, 2014 
Oceanic, Copper Canyon Press, 2018 
World of Wonders: In Praise of Fireflies, Whale Sharks, and Other Astonishments, Milkweed Editions, 2020, 

Anthologies

References

External links

 Audio: Aimee Nezhukumatathil reads "Letter to the Northern Lights" for Academy of American Poets
 Audio: Aimee Nezhukumatathil Reading for 'From the Fishouse''
 Audio: Slate > Aimee Nezhukumatathil Reading Hippopotomonstrosesquippedaliophobia > Jan. 20, 2004
 Review: Third Coast > Review by Review by J. Gabriel Scala of Miracle Fruit
 Review: New Pages Book Reviews
 Review: South Asian Women's Network
 Review: Our Own Voice > October 2004 > Review by Carlene Sobrino Bonnivier of Miracle Fruit
 Review: Luna: A Journal of Poetry and Translation > May 19, 2007 > Review by Rigoberto González of At the Drive-in Volcano

American women writers of Indian descent
1974 births
Living people
American people of Malayali descent
Ohio State University alumni
American women poets
National Endowment for the Arts Fellows
Poets from Ohio
Writers from Chicago
American poets of Asian descent
American writers of Filipino descent
21st-century American poets
21st-century American women writers
Poets from Illinois
University of Mississippi faculty
American writers of Indian descent
American women academics